Zarema (Halilova) is a Crimean-American singer, songwriter and actress of Crimean Tatar descent. She was born while the ethnic Crimean Tatars were in deportation in Uzbekistan, having been expelled from their native lands on the Crimean Peninsula in the Black Sea as part of the USSR's ethnic cleansing (later recognized by the Ukrainian government in November, 2015 as genocide). It was not until 1989, after the fall of the USSR that the Crimean Tatars were allowed to return to their homeland of Crimea.

After graduating with a bachelor's degree in acting for dramatic theatre and film from the National University of Theatre, Film and Television in Kiev, Ukraine, Zarema learned to speak Turkish and wrote several songs in Turkish. In 2007, she signed a recording contract with Sony BMG Music Entertainment Turkey and relocated to Istanbul for one year. There she released her self-titled debut Turkish language album which went on to achieve critical acclaim throughout Europe. Her music video "Atak" reached number one music video status on many television channels in Turkey, including Kral TV, Genç TV, MTV, Number One TV, and Viva! TV and was the first ever video in Turkey to exceed 400,000 views on Youtube.com.

In late 2008, Zarema moved to Los Angeles, California and in 2012 became a United States citizen. She has written many songs in English, a number of which have attracted considerable attention on online Music pools and have been played on numerous American radio stations.

With a degree in theater and film, Zarema has also pursued an acting career in the United States, graduating from the Stella Adler Studio of Acting in Hollywood and studying under various reputable acting coaches. She became a member of the American Federation of Television and Radio Artists (AFTRA) in 2009 and in 2010 became a member of the Screen Actors Guild (SAG, now SAG-AFTRA).

Fluent in Russian, Turkish, Ukrainian, Crimean Tatar, and English, Zarema has been sought-after for her multi-lingual voice-over work, performing on numerous popular movies and television shows.

Early life 
Spending her early childhood in Uzbekistan, Zarema was surrounded by a musical family. Her grandparents all had a passion for singing, as did her father, and she and her siblings followed suit. Zarema herself decided at the age of four that she wanted to become a singer and she sang in music contests and school performances at every opportunity.

When Crimean Tatars were allowed to return from deportation, Zarema's family moved to their national homeland of Crimea in the Black Sea, and it was there that she wrote her first lyrics and songs in the Crimean Tatar language. By the time Zarema was eight years old, she had begun studying piano and from age 9 until she graduated from high school, she studied piano, violin, solfeggio, and chorus.

Many of her song lyrics were inspired by the tormented Crimean Tatar history, and her patriotism and strong affinity for her cultural homeland of Crimea. For several years, Zarema was enlisted to read her lyrics at the annual commemorative ceremony at the grave of the legendary Crimean Tatar poet, Eshref Shemyi-zade, who in 1978 had been laid to rest in a cemetery near her hometown.

At age 10, Zarema gave her first radio interview and at age 11 she submitted some of her lyrics to Crimea's biggest newspaper, Dostluk and the lyrics were subsequently published in the paper. Shortly thereafter, Zarema was paid a visit at her family home by representatives of Dostluk. It was they who recommended that Zarema attend the Artek Children's Camp in Hurzuf, Crimea and sponsored her attendance there that Summer. Her lyrics were also later published in various other Crimean newspapers and magazines.

Throughout her childhood, Zarema performed in the town hall in her hometown as the lead singer of the band, both for routine performances and for holidays and special occasions. She often organized and produced neighborhood music performances, as well.

At age 13, Zarema produced her first video of her original song, "Ayi-Dag" and it was played on Crimean television station, 
Крым (National Television and Radio).

Zarema was participating in regional and national music competitions and festivals by age 15 and as a young adult, Zarema moved to Kiev, Ukraine to attend university. Later, she was invited back to Artek to sing her original music, performing in front of the President of Ukraine, Leonid Kuchma.

Education and career 
Zarema attended the National University of Theatre, Film and Television in Kiev, Ukraine, where she studied acting for dramatic theatre and film, graduating with a bachelor's degree.

The following year, Zarema met renowned Ukrainian music producer, Mikhail Nekrasov, and collaborated with him to co-write the songs, "Savash" and "Hop Soyle". Written in Turkish, both of these songs achieved critical acclaim and were played extensively on radio stations, music channels and nightclubs in many countries throughout Europe, Asia, Canada and Israel. She gave live performances on various radio stations and TV programs.

The success of "Savash" and "Hop Soyle" drew the attention of Sony BMG Music Entertainment Turkey and she ultimately signed a recording contract with Sony to record her debut Turkish album. Writing her own music and lyrics, Zarema collaborated with the legendary Turkish producer, Ozan Colakoglu and his production company, Sarı Ev (Yellow House), and also Mustafa Ceceli, Özgür Buldum, and other well-known Turkish producers to produce and promote her self-titled debut album.

Zarema shot a music video for Atak, one of the songs from the album, in Kiev with the well-known Ukrainian video director, Alan Badoev. The video was widely viewed and Zarema became the first ever artist in Turkey to exceed 400,000 views on YouTube. In 2008, her video became the number one video on all of the most popular music channels in Turkey, including Kral, Genc TV, Viva TV, Number One TV, and Dream TV.

Zarema's music gained significant media attention and she was featured in numerous newspapers and magazines, appearing on the cover of many, including Hurriyet, Milliyet, Sabah, Vatan, Takvim, and others.

In promoting her album, Zarema performed concerts in many well-known venues around the world, performing in front of 10,000 spectators in Baku, Azerbaijan and 20,000 in Moscow's Olimpijskij stadium.

After touring to promote her album with Sony Music Turkey, Zarema relocated to Los Angeles[29], California and began a new phase of her life. There she learned to speak English and in 2012 became a US citizen.

As a university-trained actress, Zarema began pursuing an acting career in Los Angeles, graduating from the Stella Adler Academy of Acting in Hollywood and studying under various reputable acting coaches. She became a member of the American Federation of Television and Radio Artists (AFTRA) in 2009 and in 2010 became a member of the Screen Actors Guild (SAG, now SAG-AFTRA).

Fluent in Russian, Turkish, Ukrainian, Crimean Tatar, and English, Zarema has been sought-after for her multi-lingual voice-over work, performing on numerous popular movies and television shows, including "Madam Secretary", "MacGyver", "Charlie's Angels", "6 Underground", "Homeland", "Criminal Minds", "Castle", "Cypher", "Arrow", "Wayne", "Covert Affairs", "Darkest Hour", "Legends of Tomorrow", "Jack Ryan", "The Brave", "Taken", "Whiskey Cavalier","NCIS", "SEAL Team (TV series)", "The Queen's Gambit (miniseries)", "For All Mankind (TV Series)", "Without Remorse" and Ava's Impossible Things (2016 film).

Along with pursuing her acting career in the US, Zarema has also written many songs in English, a number of which have attracted considerable attention on online Music pools and have been played on numerous American radio stations.

Night of My life 
In 2018, Zarema recorded and released a new English language song, "Night of My Life", produced and co-written by multiple-Grammy Award-winning producer, RedOne. Zarema was inspired to work with RedOne by his journey from humble beginnings in Morocco to his musical debut in Sweden, followed by his meteoric rise in the US, with his prominent hit songs like "Just Dance", "Poker Face", "Bad Romance", and "Alejandro" for Lady Gaga, "On the Floor" for Jennifer Lopez and Pitbull, "Rain Over Me" for Marc Anthony and Pitbull, "C'est la Vie" for Khaled, and "I Like It" for Enrique Iglesias. The melody for "Night of My Life" was co-written by RedOne and Zarema and the lyrics were co-written by Zarema and John Anthony Russell. "Night of My Life" was released in numerous countries by Roton Music of Romania and Dogan Music of Turkey.

References

Living people
Turkish film actresses
Turkish television actresses
Turkish female models
Turkish women singers
Turkish singer-songwriters
Year of birth missing (living people)
Place of birth missing (living people)